"Stick That in Your Country Song" is a song written by Jeffrey Steele and Davis Naish, and recorded by American country music artist Eric Church. It was released on June 25, 2020 as the lead single for Church's seventh studio album Heart. It was nominated for the Grammy Award for Best Country Solo Performance.

Content
The song was written by Jeffrey Steele and Davis Naish. In it, Church addresses several social issues and situations including underprivileged lives in urban centers, a soldier coming back from war, and an overworked and underpaid school teacher.

Chart performance
"Stick That in Your Country Song" debuted and peaked at number 22 on the Billboard Country Airplay chart for the week dated July 4, 2020, making it Church's highest debut to date.

Charts

Weekly charts

Year-end charts

Certifications

References

2020 songs
2020 singles
Eric Church songs
Songs written by Jeffrey Steele
Song recordings produced by Jay Joyce
EMI Records singles